The High Commission of Antigua and Barbuda in London is the diplomatic mission of Antigua and Barbuda in the United Kingdom. It shares the building with the High Commission of Belize.

References

External links
 Official site

Antigua and Barbuda
Diplomatic missions of Antigua and Barbuda
Antigua and Barbuda–United Kingdom relations
Buildings and structures in the City of Westminster
Marylebone